Sir James Henry Norritt   (1887 – 21 July 1963) was a Northern Irish businessman who was Lord Mayor of Belfast for the Ulster Unionist Party from 1951 to 1953.  His mayoralty made him an ex-officio member of the Senate of Northern Ireland.

Norritt was born in Belfast in 1887, the son of James Norritt and Elizabeth Best. He began his career in the Belfast shipbuilders Harland and Wolff, working his way to an executive position.  From 1930 to 1962, he worked for the beverage company Cantrell and Cochrane before retiring. He was knighted in the 1953 Coronation Honours List.

References

External links
Belfast City Government: Lord Mayors 

1887 births
1963 deaths
Knights Bachelor
High Sheriffs of Belfast
Lord Mayors of Belfast
Members of the Senate of Northern Ireland 1949–1953
Ulster Unionist Party members of the Senate of Northern Ireland